Balingian may refer to:
Balingian, a town in Sarawak, Malaysia
Balingian (state constituency), represented in the Sarawak State Legislative Assembly